Todd Gillman (born 24 February 1967) is a Canadian former ski jumper who competed in the 1988 Winter Olympics. He was born in Winnipeg, Manitoba.

References

1967 births
Living people
Canadian male ski jumpers
Olympic ski jumpers of Canada
Ski jumpers at the 1988 Winter Olympics
Sportspeople from Winnipeg